Jay Thomas Evans (January 21, 1931 – March 18, 2008) was an American wrestler. He was Olympic silver medalist in Freestyle wrestling in 1952. He also competed at the 1956 Olympics.

References

External links

1931 births
2008 deaths
Wrestlers at the 1952 Summer Olympics
Wrestlers at the 1956 Summer Olympics
Oklahoma Sooners wrestling coaches
American male sport wrestlers
Olympic silver medalists for the United States in wrestling
Medalists at the 1952 Summer Olympics
Pan American Games medalists in wrestling
Pan American Games gold medalists for the United States
Wrestlers at the 1955 Pan American Games
20th-century American people
21st-century American people